This list of notable Auburn University people includes alumni, faculty, and former students of Auburn University.

Each of the following alumni, faculty, and former students of Auburn University is presumed to be notable, receiving significant coverage in multiple published, secondary sources which are reliable, intellectually independent of each other, and independent of the subject. See: Notability on Wikipedia.

Academia 
 Ali Abdelghany (1980), Egyptian marine biologist
 Wilford S. Bailey (1942), 13th president of Auburn University
 P. O. Davis (1916), radio pioneer; Alabama Extension Service director; national agricultural leader and spokesman
 Luther Duncan (1900 and 1907), 4-H pioneer, Cooperative Extension administrator; Auburn University President
 Jeffrey S. Harper (1998), executive director at Scott College of Business, Indiana State University
 Joni E. Johnston, licensed clinical psychologist and author 
 Vincent Poor (1972 and 1974), dean, School of Engineering and Applied Science at Princeton University; member of the National Academy of Engineering (2001) and of the National Academy of Sciences (2011), recipient of John Fritz Medal (2016)
 Walter Merritt Riggs (1892), president of Clemson University (1910–1924), "father of Clemson football"
 E. T. York (1942 and 1946), Alabama Cooperative Extension System director (1959–1961); interim president of the University of Florida (1973–1974); chancellor of the State University System of Florida (1974–1980)

Architecture, design and construction 
 Jennifer Bonner (born 1979), architect 
 Tom Hardy (1970), design strategist, corporate head of the IBM Design Program 
 Samuel Mockbee (1974), architect, founder of Auburn's Rural Studio, 2004 AIA Gold Medal; MacArthur Fellow (2000)
 Paul Rudolph (1940), architect, chairman of Yale Department of Architecture, 1958–1965

Arts and humanities 
 Ace Atkins (1994), author and journalist
 Margaret Boozer (1989), ceramist and sculpture artist
 Ashley Crow (1982), movie and TV actress
 Tim Dorsey (1983), author
 Kenneth R. Giddens (1931), director of Voice of America and founder of WKRG-TV, Inc. in Mobile, Alabama
 Thom Gossom, Jr. (1975), actor
 Sophia Bracy Harris (B.S. 1972), child care leader, MacArthur Fellow (1991)
 Daniel L. Haulman (1983 PhD), aviation historian and writer
 Kate Higgins (1991), voice actress, notably Sakura Haruno on Naruto
 Bill Holbrook (1980), cartoonist, On The Fast Track, Safe Havens and Kevin & Kell
 Jimmy Johnson (1974), cartoonist, Arlo and Janis
 Rheta Grimsley Johnson (1977), syndicated newspaper columnist
 Justice Leak (2003), actor, The Great Debaters
 Richard Marcinko (M.A. Political Science), founder U.S. Navy SEAL Team SIX and Red Cell; author of Rogue Warrior and other fiction and non-fiction books
 Big Bill Morganfield (Communications), blues singer and guitarist
 Michael O'Neill (1974), actor
 Kimberly Page (1990), actress and professional wrestling valet
 Lallah Miles Perry (1945), artist and painter
 Van Allen Plexico (1990 B.A., 1994 M.A.), award-winning author and educator
 Selena Roberts (1988), author, sportswriter, and digital entrepreneur
 Jeanne Robertson (1967), comedian and humorist, Miss North Carolina 1963, SEC Entrepreneur of the Year in 2000
 Gerald Roush (1968 B.A., 1973 M.A.), Ferrari historian, publisher of the Ferrari Market Letter
 Phillip Sandifer (1977–78), writer, recording artist
 Jason Sanford (1993), science fiction author
 Elmo Shropshire (1964), veterinarian and singer, best known for "Grandma Got Run Over by a Reindeer"
 Anne Rivers Siddons (1958), author
 Eugene Sledge (1955), World War II Marine, author of With the Old Breed: At Peleliu and Okinawa
 Octavia Spencer (1994), Oscar, BAFTA,   Golden Globe and SAG Award-winning actress
 William Spratling (1921), silversmith and artist, "father of Mexican silver"
 Travis S. Taylor (1991), science fiction author and host of Rocket City Rednecks on National Geographic Channel
 Toni Tennille (1962), award-winning singer, half of the singing group Captain & Tennille
 Cynthia Tucker (1976), syndicated columnist, Atlanta Journal-Constitution editorial page editor, Pulitzer Prize winner
 Katherine Webb (2012), Miss Alabama USA 2012; Top 10 at Miss USA 2012
 Dave Williamson, stand-up comedian
 Drake White, country music singer
 Jake Adam York (1993), poet

Athletics
 Willie Anderson (1996), NFL offensive tackle
 William Andrews (1978), former all-pro running back for the Atlanta Falcons
 Billy Atkins, NFL defensive back and punter
 Joanna Atkins (2011), NCAA Track and Field Champion 2009 and multiple-time international medalist 
 Bryce Brown, NBA player
 Tom Banks (1970), NFL professional player and four-time Pro Bowler with the St. Louis Cardinals
 Blayne Barber (2012), professional golfer, PGA Tour
 Charles Barkley (1986), retired NBA Player, 11x NBA All-star, NBA MVP
Fred Beasley (1997), NFL professional player; one-time Pro Bowler and two-time All-Pro with the San Francisco 49ers
 Mark Bellhorn (1997), Major League Baseball player (played for World Series-winning Red Sox in 2004)
 Rob Bironas (2000), professional football player; one-time Pro Bowler and one-time All-Pro
 George Bovell (2009), Olympic silver medal swimmer for Trinidad and Tobago
 Dieter Brock, Canadian Football League and National Football League player
 James Brooks (1980), four-time pro bowl NFL running back
 Ronnie Brown (2004), professional football player and first round NFL draft pick by the Miami Dolphins
 Aundray Bruce (1987), National Football League player
 Jason Campbell (2004), professional football player and first round NFL draft pick by the Washington Redskins
 Randy Campbell (1984), 1983 SEC Championship quarterback, president of Campbell Wealth Management, LLC
 Kirsty Coventry (2006), Olympic gold medal swimmer for Zimbabwe
 Joe Cribbs (1980), NFL running back with the Buffalo Bills.
 Marquis Daniels (2003), NBA basketball player for the Boston Celtics, 2004 NBA All-Rookie Second Team
 Stephen Davis (1996), running back in the National Football League
 Josh Donaldson, third baseman for the New York Yankees, 2015 AL MVP
 Jason Dufner (2000), winner of the 2013 PGA Championship, PGA Tour
 Rowdy Gaines (1982), Olympic gold medalist, world record holder and television sports commentator
 Frank Gatski (1945), National Football League Hall of Famer with the Cleveland Brown
 Matt Geiger (1989), NBA center with the Orlando Magic
 Kevin Greene (1985), Pro-Bowl NFL linebacker and WCW pro wrestler 
 Dave Hill (1962), American Football League  and National Football League player with the Kansas City Chiefs 
 Jared Harper, NBA player
 Billy Hitchcock, (1938) professional baseball infielder, coach, manager and scout.
 Jimmy Hitchcock, (1932) Major League Baseball player. Auburn's first All-American in both football and baseball.
 Margaret Hoelzer (2005), Olympic medalist (100m backstroke, 200m backstroke, and 4x100 medley relay)
 Roderick Hood (2003), professional football player
 John Hudson (1989), professional football player
 Tim Hudson, professional baseball pitcher with the Oakland Athletics, Atlanta Braves, and San Francisco Giants, four time All-Star
 Stephen Huss (2000), 2005 Wimbledon Men's Doubles champion — the first-ever as a qualifier 
 Bo Jackson (1992), 1985 Heisman trophy winner, professional football and baseball player
 Eddie Johnson (1976), NBA All-Star guard
 Rudi Johnson (2001), professional football running back
 Beverly Kearney (1981), head women's track and field coach at the University of Texas
 Patton Kizzire, professional golfer (2008)
 Mike Kolen (1969), NFL linebacker with the Miami Dolphins.
 Sunisa Lee (2025), artistic gymnast, 2020 Olympic all-around champion
 Marcus McNeill (2005), National Football League player and Pro Bowler with the San Diego Chargers
 John Mengelt (1970), NBA guard
 Dave Middleton (1954), National Football League player with the Detroit Lions
 Alvin Mitchell, football player
 Mike Mitchell (1978), 12-year NBA player
 Chris Morris (1987), NBA forward
 Cam Newton (2015), NFL quarterback, 2010 Heisman Trophy winner, 1st pick of the 2011 NFL Draft, 2011 NFL Rookie of the Year, and 2015 NFL MVP
 Cody Parkey (2013), NFL Pro Bowl kicker
 Chuck Person (1986), NBA forward, 1987 NBA Rookie of the Year
 Wesley Person (1987), NBA guard
 Jay Ratliff (2004), professional football player; four-time Pro Bowler and one-time All-Pro with the Dallas Cowboys
 Tony Richardson (1994), professional football player; three-time Pro Bowler with the Kansas City Chiefs and Minnesota Vikings
 Quentin Riggins (1990), player of gridiron football
 Tracy Rocker (1989), professional football player, 1988 Outland Award winner and 1988 Lombardi Trophy winner
 Carlos Rogers (2004), professional football player and first round NFL draft pick by the Washington Redskins
 Erk Russell (1949), four-sport letterman, first and long-time coach of the Georgia Southern Eagles football team winning three NCAA Division I-AA championships (1985, 1986, 1989)
 Frank Sanders (1994), National Football League player
 Takeo Spikes (1998), NFL linebacker
Josh Sullivan, Major League Baseball player
 Frank Thomas (1989), Major League Baseball player, 2014 National Baseball Hall of Fame inductee
 Cliff Toney (1981), football player
Sesugh Uhaa (Professional Wrestling), wrestling name Apollo Crews
 Marcus Washington (1999), National Football League Pro Bowl player
 Ed West (1983), professional football player
 Carnell "Cadillac" Williams (2004), professional football player; 2005 NFL first round draft pick by the Tampa Bay Buccaneers
 Alexander Wright (1989), professional football player

Athletic coaches 
 Tim Beckman (1989 M.A.), head football coach at University of Illinois at Urbana–Champaign
 Vince Dooley (1954 B.S., M.A. History 1963), University of Georgia head football coach, 1964–1988; athletic director, 1979–2004
 Ralph "Shug" Jordan (1932), coach of Auburn Tigers football team, 1951–1975; most wins in Auburn history, including 1957's 10–0 season and 1957 National Championship
 Beverly Kearney (1981), head women's track and field coach University of Texas
Tony Levine (2003 Masters; educational specialist in adult education), football coach
 David Marsh (1981 B.A.), head swimming coach of Auburn University, 1990–2007
 Will Muschamp (1996 M.A.), college football coach, former head coach at University of Florida and University of South Carolina
 Erk Russell (1946 B.A., 1949 M.A), football coach at Georgia Southern, 1981–1989
 Tim Stowers (1980 B.S. 1982 M.E.), football coach at Georgia Southern, 1990–1995
 Tommy Tuberville (1954), head coach of the Auburn Tigers football team (1999–2008) and United States Senator from Alabama (2021).
 Richard Quick Auburn Men's and Women's head swimming coach (1978–1982) and (2007–09)

Business and economics 
 Donald J. Boudreaux (1986), economist
 John Brown (1957), former CEO and chairman of the board, Stryker Corporation
 Timothy D. Cook (1982), CEO of Apple Inc.
 Joe Forehand (1971), former chairman and CEO of Accenture
 Millard Fuller (1957), founder of Habitat for Humanity
 Samuel Ginn (1959), wireless communications pioneer; former chairman of Vodafone
 John M. Harbert (1946), businessman and founder of Harbert Corporation
 Raymond J. Harbert (1982), founder, chairman and CEO of Harbert Management Corporation; trustee; namesake of the Raymond J. Harbert College of Business
 Don Logan (1966), former CEO of Time Inc.; former chairman of Time Warner Cable
 Mohamed Mansour (1971 MBA), billionaire, chairman of Mansour Group
 Youssef Mansour (1972 MBA), Egyptian billionaire businessman
 Mark Spencer (1999), president and CEO of Digium, creator of Asterisk PBX
 Mark Thornton (1989 Ph.D.), economist
 Jimmy Wales (1989), co-founder of Wikipedia
 Arthur L. Williams, Jr. (M.S.), insurance executive

Government and politics 
 Rick Austin (1993), Former Georgia State Representative
 Spencer Bachus (1969), Congressman, U.S. House of Representatives 
 Bobby Bright (1975), former Congressman from Alabama's 2nd congressional district; former mayor of Montgomery
 Rick Bright (1997), immunologist and virologist, director of the Biomedical Advanced Research and Development Authority at the U.S. Department of Health and Human Services.
 James R. Bullington, diplomat and former ambassador to Burundi
 LTG Ronald L. Burgess, Jr. (USA, Ret.) (1974), 17th Director of the Defense Intelligence Agency, 2009–2012 
 Joyce Chandler – former educator and member of the Georgia House of Representatives. 
 Nader Dahabi, former prime minister of the Hashemite Kingdom of Jordan
 Amir Eshel, major general; former Commander-in-Chief of the Israeli Air Force
 Michael Hood, lieutenant-general; former commander of the Royal Canadian Air Force
Kay Ivey (1967), Governor of Alabama, 2017–present; 30th Lieutenant Governor of Alabama, 2011–2017
 Fob James (1957), Governor of Alabama, 1979–1983, 1995–1999 
 Kirsty Coventry  Minister of Youth, Sport, Arts and Recreation in the Cabinet of Zimbabwe 
 Bill Lee (1981), Governor of Tennessee, 2019–present
 Cole McNary, Republican member of the Missouri House of Representatives, 2009-2013
 Harold D. Melton (1988), Georgia Supreme Court Justice, 2005–present 
 Brady E. Mendheim Jr. Supreme Court of Alabama Justice 
 Richard Myers, general (USAF, Ret) (1967, M.S.), Chairman of the Joint Chiefs of Staff for the United States of America 
Rick Pate (1978), Commissioner of Alabama Department of Agriculture and Industries
 Gordon Persons (1922), Governor of Alabama, 1951–1955 
 Major Gen. Wilton B. Persons (1916), special adviser to President Eisenhower 
 Joe Turnham (1981), former Alabama Democratic Party Chairman and congressional candidate
 Sidney A. Wallace (1969), rear admiral (USCG, Ret.)
 Susan Whitson (1991), press secretary, Office of First Lady Laura Bush

Religious leaders
 Russell Kendrick (1984), Bishop of the Episcopal Diocese of the Central Gulf Coast

Military
 Jimmie V. Adams (1957), US general
 Lloyd J. Austin III (1985), United States Army general; commander of United States Central Command, 2013–2016; United States Secretary of Defense, 2021-present
 Robert E. Bailey (1975), United States Air Force lieutenant general, commander 
 Robert Lee Bullard, United States Army lieutenant general, commander, Second US Army in World War I (one of the two US Armies in General Pershing's AAF in the War)
 Jay W. Kelley (1973), United States Air Force lieutenant general, commander of Air University, Maxwell Air Force Base
 James E. Livingston (1962), USMC Major General and Medal of Honor recipient
 Carl Mundy, Jr. (1957), Commandant of the United States Marine Corps (1991–1995)
 Robert Ernest Noble (B.S. 1890, M.S. 1891), Alabama Polytechnic Institute graduate who served as a major general in the U.S. Army
 Eric O'Neill (1995), FBI Investigative Specialist; key figure in arrest of double-agent Robert Hanssen; subject of the 2007 film Breach
 Michael S. Rogers, United States Navy Admiral; director of NSA; commander of US Cyber Command
 Paul Selva (1992), United States Air Force; vice-chairman of the Joint Chiefs of Staff
 Hugh Shelton (1973, M.S.), retired general; Chairman of the Joint Chiefs of Staff, 1997–2001
 Holland Smith (1901), United States Marine Corps general, "father of modern U.S. amphibious warfare" 
 Johnny Micheal Spann (1992), first American killed in combat after the U.S. invasion of Afghanistan
 Alvin Vogtle, World War II fighter pilot who inspired Steve McQueen's character in The Great Escape
 H. Marshal Ward (1982), United States Air Force general, retired in 2001
 Mike Minihan (1989), United States Air Force General, Commander Air Mobility Command
 James C. Slife (1989), United States Air Force Lieutenant General, Commander Air Force Special Operations Command
 David A. Krumm (1989, 1990), United States Air Force Lieutenant General, retired, former Commander Alaskan Command

Science and engineering 
 Byron Lavoy Cockrell (1957), aeronautical engineer and rocket scientist
 Tim Cook (1982), Apple CEO
 Lester Crawford (1963), former Food and Drug Administration Commissioner
 Wilbur Davenport, engineer and scientist known for his work on communication systems; member of the National Academy of Engineering (1975)
 Jan Davis (1977), astronaut, STS-47, STS-60
 Hank Hartsfield (1954), astronaut, STS-4, STS-41-D, STS-61-A
 Cherri M. Pancake (Ph.D. 1986), elected Fellow (2001) and president (2018–) of the ACM
 Miller Reese Hutchison (1897), inventor of the electric hearing aid and Klaxon automobile horn
 John Junkins (B.S. 1965), distinguished professor of Aerospace Engineering at Texas A&M University; member of the National Academy of Engineering (1996)
 Oliver D. Kingsley, Jr. member of the National Academy of Engineering (2003)
 Hugh S. Knowles, member of the National Academy of Engineering (1969)
 Francis Ernest Lloyd (1906–1912), botanist; president of the Royal Society of Canada, 1932–33
 Joseph Majdalani, professor of Aerospace Engineering
 Ken Mattingly (1958), astronaut, Apollo 13 (pulled), Apollo 16 (spacewalk), STS-4, STS-51-C
 Jessica A. Scoffield, microbiologist and professor at the University of Alabama at Birmingham
 Kathryn Thornton (1974), astronaut; second US woman to perform a spacewalk; STS-33, STS-49, STS-61, STS-73
 James Voss (1972), astronaut, STS-44, STS-53, STS-69, STS-101, ISS
 Paul B. Weisz (B.S.), National Medal of Technology and Innovation recipient (1992) and member of the National Academy of Engineering (1977)
 Clifton Williams (1954), Gemini astronaut, test pilot

Notable students who attended but did not graduate 

 Andy Andrews, self-help/advice author and corporate speaker

 Jimmy Buffett, singer/songwriter; was a pledge of Sigma Pi Fraternity, but graduated from The University of Southern Mississippi
 Tom Cochran (1924–2010), former fullback for the NFL
 Jon Coffelt (1986), artist, painter, sculptor
 Ricky Dillon, YouTube personality
 Toney Douglas, NBA basketball player for the Houston Rockets
 Dan Evins, entrepreneur and founder of Cracker Barrel
 Nick Fairley, NFL defensive tackle, 2010 Lombardi Award Winner and 13th pick in the 2011 NFL Draft
 Tucker Frederickson, All-American and NFL running back for the New York Giants (1965–1971). 
 Bobby Goldsboro, singer
 Mallory Hagan, Miss America 2013
 Taylor Hicks, singer, winner on season five of American Idol
 Josh Hopkins, actor, Cougar Town; member of Lambda Chi Alpha fraternity
 Tim Hudson (1997), Major League Baseball pitcher for the San Francisco Giants
 Victoria Jackson, comedian of Saturday Night Live fame ("I went to three colleges and Auburn was my last one and favorite one.")
 Brandon Jacobs, NFL running back
 César Cielo, won three Olympic medals for swimming; current world record holder in the 100-metre and 50-metre freestyle
 Rudi Johnson, NFL running back
 Paul McDonald, singer, songwriter, placed 8th on tenth season of American Idol and lead singer of the Grand Magnolias (formerly Hightide Blues)
 John Mengelt, former NBA player 1971–1981 and network ABC basketball analyst
 Herman Clarence Nixon, professor, member of the Southern Agrarians
 Lionel Richie, Grammy award-winning singer, notable for his contribution to the Commodores
 Red Smith (1912), Major League Baseball third baseman for Brooklyn
 Frank Thomas, professional baseball player and 2014 National Baseball Hall of Fame inductee

Faculty 

 Frank W. Applebee, painter, head of the art department at Auburn University
 Herbert W. Ehrgott, U.S. Air Force general
 Wayne Flynt, professor emeritus; authority on Alabamian history and Baptist history in Alabama; author of 11 books, including the Pulitzer-nominated Poor But Proud: Alabama's Poor Whites
 Thomas M. Humphrey, economist
 Olav Kallenberg, mathematician known for research in the field of probability theory
 Krystyna Kuperberg, mathematician known for creating a counterexample to the Seifert conjecture
 Nathaniel Thomas Lupton, professor of chemistry
 Henry Rolle, track and field coach 1998–2018
 Mel Rosen, track coach
 Mrinal Thakur, mechanical engineering faculty, co-discoverer of conducting polymers
 James Voss, former U.S. astronaut and veteran of five spaceflights; teaches courses on space mission design
 Terry Todd, Women's Powerlifting Hall of Fame

References 

 
Auburn University people